Fiona Press is an Australian actress whose career has spanned over 30 years.

She won the 1991 AFI Award for Best Actress in a Supporting Role for her role in Waiting. She has acted in films, such as Black Water and Disgrace, on stage including the original Australian cast of 1984. She has appeared in Doctor Doctor, Upright, Diary of an Uber Driver, and Secret City 2: Under the Eagle.

She currently plays Hazel Murphy in television series The Heights.

Filmography

References

External links

20th-century births
Year of birth missing (living people)
Living people
Australian television actresses
Australian film actresses